Virgibacillus soli is a species of Gram-positive bacteria. A strain of this species was originally isolated from soil on a mountain in Taiwan. It is closely related to the species Virgibacillus halophilus and Virgibacillus kekensis.

References

External links
Type strain of Virgibacillus soli at BacDive -  the Bacterial Diversity Metadatabase

Further reading
 

Bacillaceae
Bacteria described in 2011